Benten Island is a small island lying  west of Ongulkalven Island in the eastern part of Lutzow-Holm Bay. It was mapped from surveys and from air photos by the Japanese Antarctic Research Expedition, 1957–62, and named "Benten-shima" ("goddess of fortune island").

See also 
 List of antarctic and sub-antarctic islands

References 

Islands of Queen Maud Land
Prince Harald Coast